Danko-Tanzou is a village in the Diébougou Department of Bougouriba Province in south- western Burkina Faso. The village has a population of 296.

References

Populated places in the Sud-Ouest Region (Burkina Faso)
Bougouriba Province